Bassiano (locally Vassiano) is a municipality (Italian: comune) in the Province of Latina in the Italian region Lazio, located about  southeast of Rome and about  northeast of Latina.

Its patron saint is Erasmus of Formia, and its church is named after him.

Bassiano borders the municipalities of Carpineto Romano, Norma, Sermoneta, Sezze.

Demographic evolution

Religion

Churches
San Nicola

References

Cities and towns in Lazio